Henry Jon Crosthwaite (born 14 October 2002) is a German professional footballer who plays as a right winger for FCA Walldorf, on loan from Darmstadt 98.

Career
Crosthwaite began his youth career at FC Cleeberg and TSG Wieseck, before joining the academy of Darmstadt 98 in 2018. In July 2020, he signed his first professional contract with the club, lasting three years until June 2023. He made his professional debut for Darmstadt in the 2. Bundesliga on 16 May 2021, coming on as a substitute in the 87th minute for Serdar Dursun against 1. FC Heidenheim. The home match finished as a 5–1 win.

On 30 August 2022, Crosthwaite was loaned to FCA Walldorf in the fourth-tier Regionalliga Südwest.

References

External links
 
 
 
 

2002 births
Living people
Sportspeople from Giessen
Footballers from Hesse
German footballers
Association football wingers
SV Darmstadt 98 players
FC Rot-Weiß Koblenz players
FC Astoria Walldorf players
2. Bundesliga players
Regionalliga players